Taywara is a town located at  at about 2,250 m altitude. The population is 15,000. It is the district center of Taywara District, Ghor province, Afghanistan.

See also 
 List of cities in Afghanistan

References 

Populated places in Ghor Province